Michael Brian Iggulden   (born November 9, 1982 in St. Catharines, Ontario) is a Canadian retired professional ice hockey centre who played in the National Hockey League (NHL) with the San Jose Sharks and the New York Islanders.

Playing career
Undrafted, and after five seasons playing for Canada's Ridley College prep school, Iggulden came to Cornell University in 2001, where he enrolled in Cornell's school of hotel executive administration management studies. Iggulden, Mike's last name, is British. He played four seasons for the Big Red before turning professional, signing with the AHL's Rochester Americans at the end of the 2004–05 season.

The San Jose Sharks invited Iggulden to their training camp in September 2005 and, after he became one of the most consistent performers for their AHL farm team at the time, the Cleveland Barons, signed him to a two-year contract on January 16, 2006. Iggulden made his NHL debut in the 2007–08 season with the Sharks on February 18, 2008, in what would be his only game with the Sharks.

On July 3, 2008, Iggulden was signed as a free agent by the New York Islanders to a one-year deal. Iggulden, on his Islanders debut, scored his first 2 NHL points on assists to Sean Bergenheim, in a 7-3 victory, against the New Jersey Devils on March 7, 2009. On March 12, Iggulden scored his first NHL goal against the Montreal Canadiens, tying the game at 1 to 1.

On July 10, 2009, Iggulden signed with Dinamo Riga of the Kontinental Hockey League. In the 2009-10 season, Iggulden enjoyed a successful debut season, registering 33 points in 55 games to help Dinamo reach the playoffs.

On July 16, 2010, Iggulden signed a lucrative one-year contract with the SCL Tigers of the Swiss National League A (NLA).

On June 12, 2011, Iggulden signed a one-year contract with the Växjö Lakers Hockey of the Swedish Elitserien (SEL). After scoring 34 points in 41 games for the Lakers, Iggulden chose to remain in the SEL, moving to fellow club Rögle BK on June 20, 2012.

After spending the 2014–15 season with German club, Kölner Haie, leading the club with 30 points in 49 games, Iggulden opted to remain in the DEL, signing a one-year deal with the Augsburger Panther on August 16, 2015. He made 42 DEL appearances for Augsburg, tallying 28 points. After the season, Iggulden turned down the club's offer to extend his contract and in May 2016, announced the end of his playing career.

Career statistics

References

External links 

1982 births
Living people
Augsburger Panther players
Bridgeport Sound Tigers players
Canadian ice hockey centres
Cleveland Barons (2001–2006) players
Cornell Big Red men's ice hockey players
Dinamo Riga players
Kölner Haie players
KHL Medveščak Zagreb players
New York Islanders players
Ice hockey people from Ontario
Rochester Americans players
Rögle BK players
Sportspeople from St. Catharines
San Jose Sharks players
Undrafted National Hockey League players
Växjö Lakers players
HC Vityaz players
Worcester Sharks players
Canadian expatriate ice hockey players in Croatia
Canadian expatriate ice hockey players in Latvia
Canadian expatriate ice hockey players in Germany
Canadian expatriate ice hockey players in Russia
Canadian expatriate ice hockey players in Sweden